For Sleepyheads Only is the 2002 debut album by Norwegian electronic band Flunk on Beatservice Records. The original pressing was on CD and vinyl while a later revised version was released only on CD in the US from Guidance Recordings.

Track listing

Beatservice CD Version
"I Love Music"
"Blue Monday"
"Miss World"
"Sugar Planet"
"Honey's In Love"
"Magic Potion"
"Your Koolest Smile"
"Kebab Shop 3 Am"
"See Thru You"
"Sunday People (Don't Bang The Drum)"
"Syrupsniph"
"Distortion"

Beatservice LP version
 I Love Music
 Blue Monday
 Miss World
 Sugar Planet
 Magic Potion
 Your Koolest Smile
 Kebab Shop 3 Am
 See Thru You
 Syrupsniph
 Honey's In Love

Guidance version
 I Love Music
 Blue Monday
 Miss World
 Honey's In Love
 Magic Potion
 Your Koolest Smile
 Kebab Shop 3 Am
 See Thru You
 Sunday People (Don't Bang The Drum)
 Indian Rope Trick
 Syrupsniph
 Distortion

2002 debut albums
Flunk albums